The following lists events that happened during 1993 in Slovakia.

Incumbents
President: Michal Kováč (starting 2 March)
Prime Minister: Vladimír Mečiar

Events
 Dissolution of Czechoslovakia
 Citizenship Act (Slovakia)

Births
29 May – Jana Čepelová, tennis player

Deaths

External links

 
1990s in Slovakia
Slovakia